Ivo Šlaus (born 26 September 1931 in Split) is a nuclear and particle physicist and Distinguished Fellow of New Westminster College.

Biography 

He earned a B.Sc. in Physics in 1954 from the University of Zagreb and a Ph.D. in physics in 1958 also from the University of Zagreb, Croatia. He has been a professor of Physics since 1967 and has held teaching posts at the Ruđer Bošković Institute, as well as several international universities including the University of California at Los Angeles (UCLA), Duke University, Georgetown University, Kyoto University and the Jožef Stefan International Graduate School in Ljubljana, Slovenia. Šlaus received national awards for research in 1962 and in 1969.

Šlaus is honorary president of the World Academy of Art and Science, dean of Dag Hammarskjold University College of International Relations (Zagreb) and a former president of WAAS. He is also a member of the international advisory council of the Club of Rome and a former president of the Croatian Association of the Club of Rome. His many scientific and diplomatic roles include: founding fellow of Academia Europaea; member of the Pugwash Council and former president of Croatian Pugwash; member of the managing board of the Balkan Political Club; chairman of the International Network of Centers for Sustainable Development; founder and former Executive Committee member of the European Physical Society; and fellow of the World Innovation Foundation. As a former member of the Croatian parliament (2000–2003), he served on board of the Committee for Education, Science and Culture, and in the role of the Chairman of the Subcommittee on Science, Technology and Higher Education. He is a Senior Network Member at the European Leadership Network (ELN).

Šlaus has a distinguished record of ethical leadership. His professional leadership experience and memberships include:

 2013–present: Honorary President, World Academy of Art and Science
 2012–present: Vice President, Council of the Inter-University Centre Dubrovnik (formerly served as Acting President)
 2011–2013: President, World Academy of Art and Science
 2010–present: Dean, Dag Hammarskjold University College of International Relations and Diplomacy
 2006–present: Corresponding Member, Montenegrin and Macedonia Academies of Sciences and Arts
 2005–present: Chairman and Director of the Southeast European Division, World Academy of Art and Science
 2005–present: Professor Emeritus of Physics, Dag Hammarskjold University College of International Relations and Diplomacy
 2003–present: Member, World Innovation Foundation
 2002–present: Member, Croatian Pugwash Council
 2000–present: Chairman, International Network of Centres for Sustainable Development
 1991–present: Member, Board of Directors, Black Sea University
 1989–present: Founder and first President, Croatian Association of The Club of Rome
 1989–present: Member, The Club of Rome
 1988–present: Founding Member, Academia Europaea
 1969–present: Founder and Executive Committee Member, European Physical Society

Šlaus’ other related professional leadership experiences and memberships include:
 1997–2007: President, Croatian Pugwash Council
 1995–2007: Deputy Director General, Inter-University Centre Dubrovnik
 2000–2004: Chairman, Board of Trustees, Rudjer Boskovic Institute
 2000–2004: Member, Croatian UNESCO National Committee
 1992–1996: Member, Croatian UNESCO National Committee
 1990–1994: Chairman, Physics Section, Academia Europaea
 1969–1973: Member, Council for Culture, Education, Science and Health, City of Zagreb, Croatia

Šlaus’ specializations include nuclear and particle physics, medical physics (radiopharmaceuticals, radiotherapy), science policy, scientometrics, and the establishment of international centres of research. He has served as a senior scientist at several institutions around the world, including:

 2006–2007: NCCU
 1992–1999: Brookhaven National Lab
 1981–1993: Los Alamos National Lab
 1981–1991: TRIUMF, Vancouver, British Columbia, Canada
 1982–1985: Naval Research Lab, Washington, D.C.

Šlaus’ academic fellowships include:
 2013–present: Distinguished Fellow, New Westminster College
 1994–present: Fellow, World Academy of Art and Science
 1991–present: Fellow, Croatian Academy of Sciences and Arts
 1996–present: Fellow, Institute of Physics, UK
 1985–present: Fellow, American Physical Society

Šlaus’ publications include 361 papers in refereed journals, 147 communications to scientific meetings, and two volumes; he has also been editor and co-editor of seven proceedings of international conferences.

In 2010 Šlaus constituted a small working group to evaluate the need for New Economic Theory and has published two recent papers based on that work.

Šlaus is a supporter of the Campaign for the Establishment of a United Nations Parliamentary Assembly, an organisation which campaigns for democratic reform in the United Nations, and the creation of a more accountable international political system.

Šlaus’ most recent papers on security and governance, nuclear disarmament, individuality, human capital, global higher education, and the new paradigm of human development can be found in Cadmus.

References

1931 births
Living people
Croatian physicists
Members of the Croatian Academy of Sciences and Arts
Members of the European Academy of Sciences and Arts
Social Democratic Party of Croatia politicians
Representatives in the modern Croatian Parliament
Members of the Montenegrin Academy of Sciences and Arts
Scientists from Split, Croatia
Members of Academia Europaea
Politicians from Split, Croatia